La Perle du Brésil (The Pearl of Brazil) is an 1851 drame lyrique in 3 acts by composer Félicien David to a French-language libretto by J. Gabriel and .

Performance history
The opera was premiered on 22 November 1851 by the Opéra-National under Edmond Seveste at the Théâtre Historique on the Boulevard du Temple. Hector Berlioz described it as "sometimes good, often bad and in all, of little advantage to the composer." Nevertheless, it was the company's first popular success, being given an unusually long run of 68 performances during the next three years. A revised version of the opera was produced in 1858–59 by the same company under its new name, Théâtre Lyrique, and its new director, Léon Carvalho, with his wife Caroline Miolan-Carvalho as Zora, and again in 1863–64 at their new theatre on the Place du Châtelet, for a total of 144 performances. It was revived at the second Salle Favart by the Opéra-Comique under Léon Carvalho on 17 May 1883 with new spoken dialogue by Jules Barbier and several cuts and revisions to the score. The role of Zora was sung by Emma Nevada. This revival received 19 performances. The opera has also been performed in Brussels (5 November 1852) and Rouen (30 January 1889).

Roles

Synopsis

Act 1
Palace of the Portuguese royal court

Zora, a young Brazilian native, was discovered in Brazil by Admiral Salvador, who brought her to Portugal and provided her with an education. She has become a favorite of the royal court, and the admiral intends to marry her. Lorenz, a young lieutenant, falls in love with her, and Salvador decides to take her back to Brazil.

Act 2
On board ship

Lorenz, who has disguised himself as a sailor, is on board in order to be near his sweetheart. The admiral recognizes him and plans to avenge himself on his rival, but a storm intervenes. The ship is compelled to seek shelter in a harbor of Brazil.

Act 3
In a Brazilian forest

Natives surround the passengers and crew, threaten them with tomahawks and almost overpower the sailors, when Zora sings a hymn to the Great Spirit. The Brazilians recognize their compatriot, fall to their knees and make peace. In gratitutde for the young girl's act, which has saved all on board, the Admiral gives his consent for Zora to marry Lorenz.

Music

Zora's "Charmant oiseau" ("Thou Charming Bird") with flute obbligato (Act 3, scene 2, No. 13) is one of the most famous coloratura arias and has been recorded by Ruth Vincent, Luisa Tetrazzini, Emma Calvé, Amelita Galli-Curci, and Mabel Garrison. Zora's ballad "Entendez-vous dans les savanes" (Act 1, scene 5, No. 3) is also notable.

Notes

Bibliography
 Letellier, Robert Ignatius (2010). Opéra-Comique: A Sourcebook. Newcastle upon Tyne: Cambridge Scholars. .
 Loewenberg, Alfred (1978). Annals of Opera 1597–1940 (third edition, revised). Totowa, New Jersey: Rowman and Littlefield. .
 Walsh, T. J. (1981). Second Empire Opera: The Théâtre Lyrique Paris 1851–1870. New York: Riverrun Press. .
 Wild, Nicole (1993). Décors et costumes du XIXe siècle. Tome II : Théâtres et décorateurs. Collections de la Bibliothèque – Musée de l'Opéra. Paris: Bibliothèque Nationale. .

External links

1858 libretto (in French) at Internet Archive

1851 operas
Operas by Félicien David
French-language operas
Operas set in Brazil
Operas